The American Pharmacists Association (APhA, previously known as the American Pharmaceutical Association), founded in 1852, is the first-established professional society of pharmacists in  the United States. The association consists of more than 62,000 practicing pharmacists, pharmaceutical scientists, student pharmacists, pharmacy technicians, and others interested in  the profession. Nearly all  U.S. pharmacy specialty organizations were originally a section or part of this association.

Mary Munson Runge became the first woman and the first African-American elected president of this association in 1979; she was president for two terms, from 1979 to 1981.

Organization 
All members choose one of these three Academies :

American Pharmacists Association - Academy of Pharmacy Practice and Management (APhA–APPM)
American Pharmacists Association - Academy of Pharmaceutical Research and Science (APhA–APRS)
American Pharmacists Association - Academy of Student Pharmacists (APhA–ASP)

The Annual Meeting & Exposition provides a forum for discussion, consensus building, and policy setting for the  pharmacy profession. The association's  Board of Trustees is responsible for broad direction setting of  the;  Association;. Policy   is developed by the APhA House of Delegates that meets each year at the association's Annual Meeting & Exposition. The House of Delegates has representatives from all major national pharmacy organizations, state pharmacy associations, federal pharmacy and APhA's three academies.

Publications 
The Association publishes two peer-reviewed journals:

 The Journal of the American Pharmacists Association, the official peer-reviewed journal of the society publishing articles on pharmacy practice, therapeutics, and health issues. 
 The Journal of Pharmaceutical Sciences, a peer-reviewed scientific journal dealing with pharmaceutical science and biotechnology

It also publishes:

 Student Pharmacist, intended for pharmacy students, 
 Transitions, an online newsletter 
 APhA DrugInfoLine, a website with summaries of current developments and new drugs 
 Pharmacy Library, a series of approved textbooks.

See also
 American Institute of Pharmacy Building, the Association's headquarters building in Washington, D.C., listed on the National Register of Historic Places
 Board of Pharmacy Specialties, independent subdivision of the APhA that certifies pharmacists in specialities
 Journal of the American Pharmacists Association, the Association's official journal
 Remington Medal, awarded annually by the APhA

References

External links
Official website

Pharmacy-related professional associations
Organizations established in 1852
Pharmaceutical industry in the United States
Pharmacy organizations in the United States
1852 establishments in the United States
Medical and health organizations based in Washington, D.C.